"Locomotive Breath" is a song by British progressive rock band Jethro Tull from their 1971 album, Aqualung.

Written as a comment on population growth, "Locomotive Breath" was meant to replicate the chugging rhythm of a train. In addition to its release on Aqualung, "Locomotive Breath" saw two different single releases and has been a live favorite. It is one of Jethro Tull's best-known songs.

Background
Lyrically, "Locomotive Breath" was inspired by Anderson's concern regarding overpopulation. He explained, "It was my first song that was perhaps on a topic that would be a little more appropriate to today's world. It was about the runaway train of population growth and capitalism, it was based on those sorts of unstoppable ideas. We’re on this crazy train, we can’t get off it. Where is it going? Bearing in mind, of course, when I was born in 1947, the population of planet earth was slightly less than a third of what it is today, so it should be a sobering thought that in one man’s lifetime, our planetary population has more than tripled. You'd think population growth would have brought prosperity, happiness, food and a reasonable spread of wealth, but quite the opposite has happened. And is happening even more to this day. Without putting it into too much literal detail, that was what lay behind that song."

The song additionally features a train motif that Anderson has employed on many songs. Anderson later said, "Train songs have been with us ever since the blues began, and I have written my fair share of these. I keep being drawn back to the subject, because public transport is part of my life. I don’t drive, so rely on buses, trains and the like."

Composition
"Locomotive Breath" was recorded in an unusual manner for the time: the track was pieced together from overdubs, as most of the parts of the song were recorded separately. Ian Anderson did his normal flute and vocal parts in addition to bass drum, hi-hat, acoustic guitar and some electric guitar parts. John Evan's piano parts were then recorded; Clive Bunker added the rest of the drums and Martin Barre finished the electric guitar parts. All of these recordings were then overdubbed onto each other because Anderson was finding it difficult to communicate his musical ideas about the song to the other band members. The song was designed to replicate the chugging of a train in its rhythm.

Anderson explained the recording process of the song in an interview, saying Locomotive Breath' was actually an utter failure when we tried to play it all together. It didn't gel. We didn't get the groove. I think John Evan recorded the piano intro, then I went out into the studio with two drum sticks and clicked them together because this was in the days before click tracks, and then I went out and played to [that] with a hi-hat and bass drum. Then Clive [Bunker] went out and added the tom-toms and the cymbals. And then I played the electric-guitar rhythm part all the way through. And then we had something that was beginning to sound a bit like a song and it had that kind of metronomic feel, which I wanted it to have, because it's about a railway train running on the tracks. So it should click-clack in time."

The song has been Jethro Tull's live encore during concerts since 1972. During some live concerts, the song would segue into the finale of Pomp and Circumstance, usually to end the concert, or an encore.

Release
"Locomotive Breath" was released on Jethro Tull's 1971 album Aqualung in 1971. An edit of the song was released in the US as a single in 1971, backed with "Wind-Up", though it did not chart. A 1976 single release of the song, backed with "Fat Man", was more successful, reaching number 59 on the Billboard charts and number 85 in Canada. The song was also released as the B-side to "Hymn 43". Since its initial releases, the song has appeared on multiple compilation and live albums, including Living in the Past, M.U. - The Best of Jethro Tull, and Bursting Out. The song receives frequent airplay on classic rock radio stations.

Ian Anderson ranked "Locomotive Breath" as one of his top 10 Jethro Tull songs. Billboard regarded the song to be Jethro Tull's best purely rock song in some time, saying that it had a similar theme and feel to "Aqualung." Cash Box praised the "incredible flute work from Ian Anderson." Ultimate Classic Rock named the song Jethro Tull's third best, saying, "This tune covers the length and breadth of Anderson’s songwriting talents, beginning with a bluesy John Evan piano intro so discreet one can barely hear it at times, before crashing into some of the most bombastic hard rock display of the band’s career."

Covers and media appearances
"Locomotive Breath" was covered by Rabbitt (starring Trevor Rabin) on their 1975 album Boys Will Be Boys, by Indian psychedelic rock band Atomic Forest in 1972, by Italo disco outfit Cat Gang in 1983, by W.A.S.P. on the reissue of their 1989 album The Headless Children (as a bonus track), Styx on their 2005 album Big Bang Theory, and Helloween on their 1999 album Metal Jukebox. A Swedish rock band, formed in 1995 by Janne Stark, takes its name from the song.

Peter Garrett of Midnight Oil and Jimmy Barnes covered the song for Max TV program My First Gig in April 2009. Nick Cave's group Grinderman covered the song during soundchecks.

The song used by Ring of Honor to open up their live events to open up the show for fans in attendance at both house shows and TV tapings.

The song was used as the background music of "The Road So Far" recap in the first episode of Supernatural season 8.

The full intro and a few lines of the song, with no other sound, accompany Otto's burial in Fargo TV series.

The song can also be briefly heard in a scene in the film Jumanji.

Personnel
 Ian Anderson – flute, lead vocals, bass drum, hi-hat, acoustic guitar, electric guitar
 John Evan – piano
 Martin Barre – electric guitar
 Jeffrey Hammond – bass guitar
 Clive Bunker – drums

References

Jethro Tull (band) songs
1971 songs
Songs written by Ian Anderson
Song recordings produced by Ian Anderson
Songs about trains
Reprise Records singles
Chrysalis Records singles
Capitol Records singles